Histone H2A-Bbd type 1 also known as H2A Barr body-deficient is a histone protein variant that in humans is encoded by the H2AFB1 gene (H2A histone family, member B1).

Function 

Histones are basic nuclear proteins that are responsible for the nucleosome structure of the chromosomal fiber in eukaryotes. Nucleosomes consist of approximately 146 bp of DNA wrapped around a histone octamer composed of pairs of each of the four core histones (H2A, H2B, H3, and H4). The chromatin fiber is further compacted through the interaction of a linker histone, H1, with the DNA between the nucleosomes to form higher order chromatin structures. This gene encodes a member of the histone H2A family. This gene is part of a region that is repeated three times on chromosome X, once in intron 22 of the F8 gene and twice closer to the Xq telomere. This record represents the most centromeric copy which is in intron 22 of the F8 gene.

References

Further reading